Eucereon leria is a moth of the subfamily Arctiinae. It was described by Herbert Druce in 1874. It is found in Panama, Ecuador and Bolivia.

References

 

leria
Moths described in 1884